Sloane Stephens defeated Madison Keys in the final, 6–3, 6–0 to win the women's singles tennis title at the 2017 US Open. It was her first major title. Stephens became the second unseeded woman in the Open Era to win the title after Kim Clijsters in 2009. It was the first all-American final at the US Open since 2002. For the first time at a major since the 1985 Wimbledon Championships, all four semifinalists were American, and all from the same country overall.

Angelique Kerber was the defending champion, but was defeated in the first round by Naomi Osaka. Kerber became the second US Open defending champion to lose in the first round, after Svetlana Kuznetsova in 2005.

Garbiñe Muguruza became the new world No. 1 despite losing in the fourth round, after Karolína Plíšková failed to defend her finalist points. Eight of the top nine seeds (with the exception of Kerber) were in contention for the top ranking.

This was Maria Sharapova's first major since the 2016 Australian Open, following a suspension for violating anti-doping rules. She was awarded a wildcard into the main draw, and was defeated by Anastasija Sevastova in the fourth round. Venus Williams became the first player in history to reach the semifinals of the US Open 10 years apart and then do so another 10 years apart (1997, 2007, and 2017). Kaia Kanepi became the first qualifier to reach the quarterfinals since Barbara Gerken in 1981.

This was also the final Grand Slam of former World No. 1 Jelena Janković, who lost to Petra Kvitová in the first round. Janković would retire from tennis five years later.

Seeds

Draw

Finals

Top half

Section 1

Section 2

Section 3

Section 4

Bottom half

Section 5

Section 6

Section 7

Section 8

Seeded players
The following are the seeded players. Seeds are based on the rankings as of August 21, 2017. Rank and points before are as of August 28, 2017.

Withdrawn players
The following players would have been seeded, but they were not entered or withdrew from the event.

Other entry information

Wild cards

Protected ranking

Qualifiers

Withdrawals

 – not included on entry list& – withdrew from entry list

Championship match statistics

Notes

References

External links
 Women's Singles main draw
2017 US Open – Women's draws and results at the International Tennis Federation

Women's Singles
US Open – Women's singles
US Open (tennis) by year – Women's singles
2017 in women's tennis
2017 in American women's sports